Ozerianivka is a settlement in Horlivka municipality of Donetsk Oblast of eastern Ukraine, at 41.8 km NNE from the centre of Donetsk city.

The settlement was taken under control of pro-Russian forces During the War in Donbass, that started in 2014.

Demographics
Native language as of the Ukrainian Census of 2001:
Ukrainian 31.98%
Russian 66.12%
Belarusian 1.30%
Armenian 0.35%
Moldovan 0.09%

References

Villages in Horlivka Raion